Tachov is a town in the Plzeň Region of the Czech Republic. It has about 13,000 inhabitants. It lies on the Mže River. The town centre is well preserved and is protected by law as an urban monument zone.

Administrative parts

Villages of Bíletín, Malý Rapotín, Mýto, Oldřichov, Světce, Velký Rapotín, Vilémov and Vítkov are administrative parts of Tachov.

Geography
The eastern and central parts of the municipal territory with the town proper lie in the Upper Palatine Forest Foothills. The Mže River flows through the town.

History
The area was inhabited by humans around 8,000–6,000 BCE. The first written mention of Tachov is from 1126. King Ottokar II of Bohemia (1233–1278) built a new castle with a massive round stone tower there. He also founded a walled town near the castle.

During the Hussite Wars (1419–1434), the town was several times besieged and conquered. In 1427, Prokop the Great defeated the crusaders in the Battle of Tachov. The Thirty Years' War (1618–1648) damaged the town considerably. In 1664, Count Johann Anton Losy became the new proprietor. The Losy family began conversion of the medieval castle to a large baroque château. In 1784, the title passed to the Windisch-Graetz family. The Windisch-Graetzs, in their turn, rebuilt the house in the classical style at great expense.

Until 1918, Tachov (as Tachau) was part of the Austrian Empire, capital of the district of Tachau, and one of the 94 Bezirkshauptmannschaften in Bohemia.

In 1938, it was occupied by the German army as part of the Sudetenland. Most of the German-speaking population was expelled in 1945 (see the Beneš decrees). The area was only partly repopulated, mostly by Czechs and Slovaks, but also by immigrants from Romania and Ukraine. Later on uranium was mined here, attracting laborers to work in the mines.

After the Velvet Revolution that ended the Communist era in 1989, the uranium mines were closed. Some German companies established factories in the area to make use of the cheap labour. However, the Tachov area is still among the economically least developed Czech regions.

Demographics

Transport
Tachov is located on the railway line Planá–Domažlice of local importance.

Sights

Castle and town fortifications
Around 1300, the town fortifications were built around the town. They gradually became a pride of Tachov, because they belong to the best-preserved wall systems in the country. The medieval town was enclosed by an 8–10 m high and 150 cm thick circular wall. There were 26 towers around the perimeter of the walls, which reached a height of 11–14 m. To this day, 21 towers or their fragments have been preserved.

The Tachov Castle with a cylindrical tower was built during the reign of Ottokar II of Bohemia. In 1802 the tower was taken down, and the Windisch-Graetz family built a Renaissance castle instead. The construction was finished in 1808 and the Windisch-Graetzs lived here until 1939. During World War II, the castle was used for civil and military purposes, but it was seriously ruined, so in 1968 there was the possibility of demolition. Eventually, the castle was saved and from 1969 to 1983 it was under reconstruction. It is now used as The School of Art and also the town hall today, so it is still open to the public.

Religious monuments

The Church of the Assumption of the Virgin Mar was originally a Gothic church, but it went through many arrangements during the 14th century. The last reconstruction lasted from 1904 to 1908 and the church was rebuilt in Neo-Gothic style. The inside arrangements come from 1670. It does not have only the classical function of a church. Nowadays there are held many concerts during the year.

The church of Saint Wenceslaus is the oldest church in Tachov and may antedate the town itself. In 1802 the Windisch-Graetzs bought it and they made it a family tomb. It is a simple building located in park, which replaced a former churchyard. There are still many tombstones of significant burgesses, who lived in Tachov during the 15th–18th century. In 1947 the Czechoslovak Hussite Church took over this place.

The former Franciscan monastery and the Church of Saint Mary Magdalene were founded in 1466 and since this year both buildings went through many reconstructions. The Italian architect Martino Allio made the first reconstruction in 1686–1694, and the most important one came in years 1745–1750. In 1945 bombs damaged the church and four years later it was closed. Since 1945, the monastery has been used as the Museum of the Upper Palatinate Forest, and it offers information about the history of Tachov and the region surrounding it. The museum is used for many activities and many expositions are held here every year.

The Jewish cemetery, founded in 1615, is located in the southern part of the town. There are 190 gravestones here, and the oldest preserved one is from 1700.

Světce

Světce is a complex of three historical buildings. One of them is a monastery built in the 17th century. Josef II cancelled it and so in 1787 the Windisch-Graetzs bought it and rebuilt it as a castle. The castle that was finished in 1700 went down, and nowadays there are only remains of the walls and a small tower. The last one is a riding hall from the time of romanticism, which was built in 1830. It is the second largest riding hall in Central Europe, after the Viennese riding hall.

Other

Husmann's Mill is a Baroque mill founded by the regent Jan Filip Husmann in 1645. During reconstruction in 2006–2007, a millwheel was restored. It is used by the Town Cultural Centre and the Tachov's Children Choir.

Mohyla is a memorial that commemorates the death of 232 people, who were killed during the death marches during the World War II.

Notable people
Moses Taku (13th century), rabbi and Tosafist
Franz Rumpler (1848–1922), Austrian painter
Mordecai Schornstein (1869–1949), Chief Rabbi of Copenhagen
Rudolf Böttger (1887–1973), Austrian painter
Karel Sperber (1910–1957), surgeon

References

External links

 
History on Bohemianet.com 
Information portal 

Populated places in Tachov District
Cities and towns in the Czech Republic
Windisch-Graetz